30 Days of Night is a 2007 American horror film based on the comic book miniseries of the same name. The film was directed by David Slade and stars Josh Hartnett and Melissa George. The story focuses on an Alaskan town beset by vampires as it enters into a 30-day-long polar night.

30 Days of Night was originally pitched as a comic, then as a film, but it was rejected. Years later, Steve Niles showed IDW Publishing the idea and it took off. The film was produced on a budget of $30 million and grossed over $75 million at the box office during its six-week run starting on October 19, 2007. Critical reviews were mixed. The film has since developed a cult following.

A sequel, Dark Days, was released on October 5, 2010, straight to home video. A prequel miniseries, Blood Trails, was released on FEARnet.com and FEARnet On Demand in 2007. Another sequel miniseries, Dust to Dust, placed chronologically before Dark Days, was released in 2008.

Plot
The town of Barrow, Alaska (now Utqiagvik), is preparing for its annual "30 Days of Night", a period during the winter with a month-long polar night. As the town gets ready, a stranger rows ashore from a large ship and sabotages the town's communications and transport to the outside world. Barrow's sheriff, Eben Oleson, investigates and also learns that his estranged wife, Stella, missed the last plane out of town and must stay the 30 days. That night, a band of vampires, led by Marlow, attacks and slaughters most of the townspeople, forcing Eben, Stella, Eben's younger brother Jake, and several other survivors to take shelter in a boarded-up house with a hidden attic. Marlow finds the stranger, who believes the vampires are going to turn him into one of them as a reward for his help, locked up in the station. Marlow thanks him for doing what he asked, and then snaps his neck.

Eighteen days later, when a blizzard hits, the group uses the whiteout to go to the general store for supplies, but is stranded after it ends. While the group heads for the station, Eben creates a diversion by having the vampires chase him to his grandmother's house, where he uses one of her ultraviolet lights to burn the face of Marlow's lover, Iris, so badly that Marlow is forced to kill her. As he escapes, the town snowplow operator, Beau, creates another distraction with his tractor, killing many of the vampires, before trying to blow himself up; when he fails, Marlow crushes his head. Eben arrives at the station, where he is then forced to kill Carter, who was bitten and has become a vampire.

On Day 27, Stella and Eben see the deputy, Billy, signaling them with a flashlight, and bring him back to the station, after finding out he killed his family to save them from a more painful death. The trio find the others have made for the utilidor, a power and sewage treatment station that still has power, and head over there, but are separated after Stella saves Gail Robbins, a young girl whose family was slaughtered by a vampire named Zurial, who was stalking her. Eben and Billy make it to the utilidor, but are attacked by the vampire Arvin, who bites Billy; Billy knocks Arvin into the heavy-duty shredder, and in doing so, grinds his own hand to a stump by accident, before being killed by Eben because he is starting to turn.

As the month comes to an end, with the sun due to rise, the vampires start to burn down the town to destroy evidence of their presence, including survivors. Realizing Stella is trapped and that he cannot beat the vampires in his current state, Eben turns himself into a vampire by injecting himself with Billy's infected blood. He confronts Marlow and they get into a vicious fight, before Marlow is finally killed by having a hole punched through his mouth and head, causing the remaining vampires to flee. Knowing he will die soon, Eben and Stella go off to watch the sunrise together, sharing one last kiss. As the sun comes up, Eben's body burns to ash in Stella's arms.

Cast

 Josh Hartnett as Sheriff Eben Oleson
 Melissa George as Stella Oleson
 Danny Huston as Marlow
 Ben Foster as the Stranger
 Mark Boone Junior as Beau Brower
 Mark Rendall as Jake Oleson
 Amber Sainsbury as Denise
 Manu Bennett as Deputy Billy Kitka
 Megan Franich as Iris
 Joel Tobeck as Doug Hertz
 Elizabeth Hawthorne as Lucy Ikos
 Nathaniel Lees as Carter Davies
 Craig Hall as Wilson Bulosan
 Chic Littlewood as Isaac Bulosan
 Peter Feeney as John Riis
 Andrew Stehlin as Arvin
 John Rawls as Zurial
 Jared Turner as Aaron
 Kelson Henderson as Gabe
 Pua Magasiva as Malekai Hamm
 Grant Tilly as Gus
 Rachel Maitland-Smith as Gail
 Kate Elliott as Dawn
 Jacob Tomuri as Seth

Production

Development
30 Days of Night author Steve Niles conceived of the story in the form of a comic, but after meeting a lack of interest in initial pitches, tried to pitch it as a film. When this did not work out, Niles shelved the idea until he showed it to IDW Publishing. IDW published the comic and Ben Templesmith provided the artwork. When Niles and his agent, Jon Levin, shopped the comic around again as a potential film adaptation, Niles found that the idea "went shockingly well", with Sam Raimi and Senator International picking up the property rights based on the original concept and Templesmith's unique mood and concepts for the vampires.

According to Raimi, the potential project was "unlike the horror films of recent years".

Following the publication of the 30 Days of Night comic book miniseries in 2002, studios, including DreamWorks, MGM, and Senator International, bid in the $1 million range for rights to a potential vampire film based on the story. Raimi expressed interest in adapting the miniseries and was negotiating a production deal with his producing partner Robert Tapert to establish a label with Senator Entertainment, of which Senator International is the sales division. In July 2002, Senator International acquired the rights for 30 Days of Night in a seven-figure deal with Raimi and Tapert attached as producers.

By October 2002, Niles was working on adapting 30 Days of Night for the big screen, keeping the film true to the miniseries, though fleshing out the characters more significantly in the adaptation process. In February 2003, Columbia Pictures partnered with Senator International to work on 30 Days of Night, which was developing under Senator International's newly established production company, Ghost House Pictures. Mike Richardson, the Dark Horse Comics publisher who supported the adaptation project from the beginning, after having turned down an offer to initially publish the project, was attached as executive producer.  The following March, Richardson revealed that Steve Niles had turned in the initial draft for the 30 Days of Night screenplay. In March 2004, however, Columbia Pictures requested that Niles's initial screenplay to be rewritten in preparation for production. Sue Binder, the business manager of Ghost House Pictures, indicated that filming for 30 Days of Night was still at least a year away, as Ghost House planned to produce three films before the vampire thriller. The following May, Stuart Beattie, one of the writers for Pirates of the Caribbean: The Curse of the Black Pearl, was rewriting Niles' 30 Days of Night draft for production. Niles was pleased with Beattie's faithfully rewritten script, which was submitted to the studio in October 2004. Adi Hasak also made uncredited contributions to the script.

In September 2005,  director David Slade was announced to have signed on to 30 Days of Night, which would be distributed by Columbia Pictures mainly in North America and Mandate Pictures in international territories. In March 2006, Slade revealed that screenwriter Brian Nelson, who wrote the screenplay for Slade's previous film Hard Candy, was writing a new draft of the 30 Days of Night script, replacing Beattie's draft.  The director said that filming would begin in summer 2006 in Alaska and New Zealand.

Casting
In June 2006,  Josh Hartnett was announced as having been cast as the husband of the married couple who serves as the town's sheriff team. Some criticized the choice because the main character (Eben Olemaun, with the last name changed to Oleson for the motion picture adaption) was originally Inuk in the comics. Melissa George joined the 30 Days of Night cast as a sheriff and wife of Hartnett's character. Danny Huston joined the cast as the leader of the vampires.

Filming
Filming did not begin immediately, but in a September 2006 interview, executive producer Mike Richardson said that 30 Days of Night would be shot on 35 mm film, though  discussion had occurred to shoot the film on Genesis.  In an interview prior to filming, Slade explained that the illustrations by Ben Templesmith would be reflected in production design. Slade also considered Nelson's draft to be the most faithful to the graphic novel. He also stated his intention to make a "scary vampire film", of which he did not think many existed. "The rest of them, they fall into all kinds of traps. We're going to try to do our best... and one of the ways we have to do it is be more naturalistic than the graphic novel, because it's very over-the-top," said Slade.  Also, concern was expressed that while the vampires needed to communicate, talking might lessen the effect. To counter this, a fictional vampire language, with click consonants, was constructed with the help of a professor of linguistics and the nearby University of Auckland.  Slade explained, "we designed this really simple language that didn't sound like any particular accent that you would be aware of, that was based around really simple actions, eating, hunting, yes, no, really basic, because that's what vampires do."

Post-production
By February 2007, the production phase was completed, and a rough cut of the film was prepared.  In April, composer Brian Reitzell was hired to score the film.

Music
Brian Reitzell composed the film's score, with Justin Meldal-Johnsen performing. A soundtrack was released by Invada Records, with an artwork by Marc Bessant in summer 2015 on vinyl.

Novelization
To coincide with the film's release, a novelization by Tim Lebbon was published by Pocket Star on September 25, 2007. It is one of six novels based on the franchise.

Release

Box office
30 Days of Night was released in 2,855 cinemas in the United States and Canada on October 19, 2007. In its opening weekend, the film grossed $15,951,902, placing first in the box office. The film grossed $39,568,996 in the United States and Canada and $35,735,361 overseas for a total of $75,304,357 worldwide.

Critical reception
On the review aggregation site Rotten Tomatoes, the film has a 51% score based on 157 reviews, with an average rating of 5.6/10. The site's consensus states: "While 30 Days of Night offers a few thrills, it ultimately succumbs to erratic execution." Metacritic reports a score of 53 out of 100 from 29 reviews, considered to be mixed or average reviews. Roger Ebert gave the film 2.5 stars out of a possible 4. He criticized several plot holes, such as the vampires moving with supernatural speed in some attacks, but ponderous slowness in others, but also singled out Danny Huston for being "quite convincing" as the vampire leader, and summed up the film as "well-made, well-photographed, and plausibly acted, and is better than it needs to be."

Home media
30 Days of Night was released February 26, 2008 on DVD, Blu-ray, and UMD for PlayStation Portable in the United States. DVD  sales brought in $26,949,780 in revenue, from 1,429,600 sold DVD units. This does not include Blu-ray sales. The DVD is a single disc and includes eight featurettes, one of which is a full episode of the anime Blood+. The UK Region 2 release is a two-disc special edition, released in April 2008. Despite being exactly the same as the theatrical release, the BBFC reclassified the film from a 15 to an 18. Though it still only has the eight featurettes on the second disc, it includes a bonus 30 Days of Night graphic novel.

TV series, prequels, and sequel
A prequel miniseries Blood Trails was released in 2007.

A sequel miniseries Dust to Dust was released in 2008.

A straight-to-DVD sequel entitled Dark Days was released on October 5, 2010. The script for the sequel was written by Steve Niles and Ben Ketai with Ketai also positioned as director. When filming began on October 20, 2009, Rhys Coiro and Mia Kirshner were named as leads, with Kirshner playing the lead vampire villain Lilith. Other cast named included Harold Perrineau, Kiele Sanchez, Diora Baird, Rhys Coiro, and Monique Ganderton.  Three days after filming began, Niles revealed that Kiele Sanchez replaced Melissa George in the role of Stella Oleson. The sequel was produced on a lower budget, but being straight-to-video allowed the writers to more closely follow the comic book.

See also
 Frostbite, a Swedish 2006 vampire film with similar theme
 Vampire film

References

External links

 
 
 
 
  at Ghost House Pictures
 Steve Niles Interview for 30 Days of Night at UGO.com
 Official multiplayer game for the film
  Composer Brian Reitzell discusses his score for 30 Days of Night

30 Days of Night
2007 films
2000s English-language films
2007 horror films
2000s supernatural horror films
American supernatural horror films
American monster movies 
Apocalyptic films
Fiction about familicide
Films based on American comics
Films directed by David Slade
Films produced by Sam Raimi
Films with screenplays by Stuart Beattie
Films set in 2007
Films set in Alaska
Films shot in New Zealand
2000s monster movies
American vampire films
Dark Horse Entertainment films
Ghost House Pictures films
Columbia Pictures films
Live-action films based on comics
IDW Publishing adaptations
American splatter films
2000s American films